Mozambique competed at the 2019 African Games held from 19 to 31 August 2019 in Rabat, Morocco. In total, athletes representing Mozambique won one gold medal, three silver medals and one bronze medal and the country finished 23rd in the medal table.

Medal summary

Medal table 

|  style="text-align:left; width:78%; vertical-align:top;"|

|  style="text-align:left; width:22%; vertical-align:top;"|

Athletics 

Two athletes represented Mozambique in athletics.

Cecilia Guambe competed in the women's 100 metres hurdles event. She competed in the heats and did not qualify to advance to the final. She was also scheduled to compete in the women's 400 metres hurdles event but she did not start.

Creve Armando Machava competed in the men's 400 metres hurdles event. He qualified in the heats but did not finish in the final.

Boxing 

Three athletes competed in boxing: Rady Gramane, Alcinda Panguane and Juliano Máquina.

Gramane won the silver medal in the women's middleweight (75kg) event.

Panguane won the silver medal in the women's welterweight (69kg) event.

Máquina competed in the men's flyweight (52kg) event.

Canoeing 

Joaquim Lobo won the silver medal in the men's C-1 200 metres event.

Nordino Mussa and Tualibudine Mussa won the gold medal in the men's C-2 200 metres event.

Judo 

Three athletes represented Mozambique in judo: Jacira Ferreira, Kevin Loforte and Ayton Siquir.

Karate 

Irene Bechane and Marinela Muchanga competed in karate.

Swimming 

Ahllan Bique and Igor Mogne represented Mozambique in swimming.

Ahllan Bique competed in the men's 50 metre freestyle, men's 50 metre breaststroke, men's 100 metre breaststroke and men's 200 metre breaststroke events.

Igor Mogne competed in the men's 100 metre butterfly and men's 200 metre freestyle events.

Volleyball 

In June 2019, Mozambique's national volleyball team qualified to compete at the 2019 African Games.

Jéssica Moiane and Mércia Mucheza won the bronze medal in the women's beach volleyball tournament.

References 

Nations at the 2019 African Games
2019
African Games